The 2017 Southland Conference tournament was held at Farris Field on the campus of the University of Central Arkansas in Conway, Arkansas from May 10 through 12, 2017. The tournament winner, the McNeese State Cowgirls, earned the Southland Conference's automatic bid to the 2017 NCAA Division I softball tournament. The Championship game was broadcast on ESPN3 with the remainder of the tournament airing on the Southland Digital Network.

Format
The top 6 teams qualified for the Southland softball tournament. Abilene Christian and Incarnate Word were ineligible due to their transition from D2 to D1. Abilene Christian finished the regular season in second place.  Since Abilene Christian was ineligible for tournament play, the third through sixth-place finishers moved up in seeding.  In addition, the Northwestern State Lady Demons, finishing the regular season in seventh place, qualified for the tournament.

Tournament
Sources:

New Orleans does not sponsor a softball team.
All times listed are Central Daylight Time.

See also
2017 Southland Conference baseball tournament

References

Southland Conference softball tournament
Tournament